Ravanan is a 1994 Indian Tamil language film directed by E. Ramdoss. The film stars Mansoor Ali Khan and Ahana, with Manorama, R. Sundarrajan, Rajesh, Vadivukkarasi, Pandu, Thyagu and B. Ashokarajan playing supporting roles. It was released on 14 January 1994.

Plot

Ravanan is a short-tempered farmer who lives with his mother and his little sister. He is known for punishing the villagers, he even severely punished his own father one day, his father then felt resentful towards Ravanan since that day and decided to live alone.

Meena, who comes from the city, is the daughter of a wealthy villager. Being an arrogant and spoiled girl, Meena often quarrels with Ravanan several times. The fight becomes worse when Meena stops Uma's timed wedding. The angry Ravanan kidnaps Meena and sequesters her in his farm. Ashokarajan, a wealthy landlord and an evil womanizer, enters in their conflict. What transpires next forms the rest of the story.

Cast

Mansoor Ali Khan as Ravanan
Ahana as Meena
Manorama as Ravanan's mother
R. Sundarrajan as Ravanan's father
Rajesh as Meena's father
Vadivukkarasi as Kannamma
Pandu
Thyagu
B. Ashokarajan as Ashokarajan
Sangita Madhavan Nair as Uma
Vichithra as Sundari
Sharmili
Nellai Siva as Punnakku
Dinesh Kumar
Ilavarasu
Singamuthu
Sellamathan
TKS Natarajan
Durai Ramachandran
Nirmala
Shalini
Sindhu
Bonda Mani
Baboos

Cameo appearance in a song 'Velicham Poranthachu'
E. Ramdoss
Rajkiran
R. Parthiban
T. Rajendar
Prashanth
Sathyaraj
Manivannan
Balu Anand

Soundtrack

The music was composed by A. K. Vasagan, with lyrics written by Kalidasan.

Reception
K. Vijiyan of New Straits Times wrote, "Ravanan is entertaining - against all expectations".

References

External links 
 

1990s Tamil-language films
1994 action films
1994 films
Films directed by E. Ramdoss
Indian action films